Pietro da Pietri (1663 – 1708, 1716, or 1721) was an Italian painter of the late-Baroque period, active mainly in Rome.

Born in Rome, he was a pupil of the painter Giuseppe Ghezzi, then of Angelo Massarotti, then assisted in the studio of Carlo Maratta. He is also known as Pietro Antonio da Pietri, Pietro dei Pietri, and Pietro de' Pietri. He painted an altarpiece of the Virgin with Saints for Santa Maria in Via Lata.

References

1663 births
18th-century deaths
Painters from Rome
17th-century Italian painters
Italian male painters
18th-century Italian painters
Italian Baroque painters
Pupils of Carlo Maratta
18th-century Italian male artists